Charaxes orilus is a butterfly in the family Nymphalidae. It was described by Arthur Gardiner Butler in 1869. It is endemic to Timor in the Australasian realm.

References

External links
Charaxes Ochsenheimer, 1816 at Markku Savela's Lepidoptera and Some Other Life Forms

orilus
Butterflies described in 1869
Butterflies of Asia
Taxa named by Arthur Gardiner Butler